Guest or The Guest may refer to:

 A person who is given hospitality
 Guest (surname), people with the surname Guest
 USS Guest (DD-472), U.S. Navy Fletcher-class destroyer 1942–1946
 Guest appearance, guest actor, guest star, etc.
 Guest comic, issue of a comic strip that is created by a different person (or people) than usual
 Guest host (or guest presenter), host, usually of a talk show, that substitutes for the regular host
 Guest operating system, operating system installed on a virtual machine
 Guest ranch (or dude ranch), type of ranch oriented towards visitors or tourism 
 Guest statute, statute in tort law
 Guest worker, person who works in a country other than the one of which he or she is a citizen

Music, literature, and film
 "The Guest" (short story), 1957 short story by Albert Camus
 Guest (album), 1994 album by Critters Buggin
 The Guest (album), 2002 album by Phantom Planet
 The Guest (TV series), 2018 South Korean television series
 The Guest (2014 American film), American thriller film directed by Adam Wingard
 The Guest (2014 Chilean film), Chilean drama film directed by Mauricio López Fernández
 , Chinese thriller film
 The Guest (2017 film), Nigerian film
 The Guest (2019 film), Burmese film
 Guest (2020 film), British short film directed by Finn Callan
 The Guest: Aleppo to Istanbul, 2017 Turkish-Jordanian film starring Saba Mubarak

Astronomy
 4325 Guest, main-belt asteroid
 Guest (lunar crater), lunar impact crater
 Guest (Plutonian crater)
 Guest star (astronomy), ancient Chinese astronomical term for novae and supernovae

Places
 Guest, Alabama
 Guest Island in the Ross Sea off Antarctica; part of the Ross Dependency claimed by New Zealand
 Guest Peninsula, in the northwest part of Marie Byrd Land, Antarctica
 Guest River, Virginia, USA

See also
 Guest beer, 1989 legislation in the British Parliament concerning the sale of beer
 
 The Guests (disambiguation)
 Be My Guest (disambiguation)
 Mystery Guest (disambiguation)
 Unexpected Guest (disambiguation)
 Baron Haden-Guest